Bryan Russell Martin (22 September 1918 – 26 July 1983) was an Australian rules footballer who played with Melbourne in the Victorian Football League (VFL).

Notes

External links 

1918 births
1983 deaths
VFL/AFL players born in England
Australian rules footballers from Victoria (Australia)
Melbourne Football Club players
English emigrants to Australia
People educated at Scotch College, Melbourne